Ogtay Shiraliyev Kazim oglu (born in 1950) is a professor, PhD and Azerbaijani politician who served as the Minister of Healthcare of Azerbaijan Republic from 2005 to 2021.

Early life
Shiraliyev was born in 1950 in Baku, Azerbaijan. He graduated from Azerbaijan Medical University and completed his doctoral degree in Moscow, Russia. In 1988, Shiraliyev was appointed the Director of State Medical Diagnostics Center which he headed for 17 years.

Political career
On October 20, 2005 President Ilham Aliyev sacked previous minister Ali Insanov replacing him with Ogtay Shiraliyev. Within three months of his term, Shiraliyev reformed the medical services in state hospitals and received 30% increase in state healthcare funding. Construction of new medical diagnostic centers and hospitals in regions of Azerbaijan became a priority. On April 23, 2021, he was dismissed as minister.

Shiraliyev headed the Eurasia Congress of Infectious Diseases.

Shiraliyev oversaw the response to the COVID-19 pandemic in Azerbaijan.

References 

1950 births
Living people
Politicians from Baku
Government ministers of Azerbaijan
Azerbaijani professors